Carlia diguliensis, the Digul River rainbow skink, is a species of skink in the genus Carlia. It is endemic to Papua New Guinea.

References

Carlia
Reptiles described in 1926
Reptiles of Papua New Guinea
Endemic fauna of Papua New Guinea
Taxa named by Felix Kopstein
Skinks of New Guinea